65 Andromedae, abbreviated 65 And, is a single, orange-hued star in the northern constellation of Andromeda. With an apparent magnitude of 4.73, it is visible to the naked eye. At that distance, its brightness is relatively lowered primarily by the inverse square law but also by an extinction of 0.16 magnitude due to interstellar dust. The star is moving closer to the Earth with a heliocentric radial velocity of −5 km/s.

This is a mildly iron-deficient giant star with a stellar classification of K4.5 III, which indicates that, at the age of three billion years, is an evolved star that has exhausted the hydrogen at its core and expanded its radius. At the estimated distance of this star, this yields a physical size of about 47 times the radius of the Sun. The star has 1.6 times the mass of the Sun and is radiating 372 times the Sun's luminosity from its enlarged photosphere at an effective temperature of 3,927 K.

References

External links
 Image 65 Andromedae

K-type giants
Andromeda (constellation)
Durchmusterung objects
Andromedae, 65
014872
011313
0699